Dmytro Ivanovych Bilonoh (born 26 May 1995) is a Ukrainian professional footballer who plays as a right winger for Polish club Chrobry Głogów.

Career
He made his debut in the Russian Premier League for FC Ural Sverdlovsk Oblast on 21 September 2015 in a game against FC Krasnodar.

References

External links
 
 
 
 

1995 births
Sportspeople from Cherkasy
Living people
Association football midfielders
Ukrainian footballers
Ukraine youth international footballers
Ukrainian expatriate footballers
Expatriate footballers in Russia
Expatriate footballers in Belarus
Expatriate footballers in Finland
Expatriate footballers in Lithuania
Expatriate footballers in Poland
Ukrainian Premier League players
Ukrainian Second League players
Russian Premier League players
Russian First League players
Belarusian Premier League players
Veikkausliiga players
A Lyga players

FC Shakhtar-3 Donetsk players
FC Ural Yekaterinburg players
FC Zirka Kropyvnytskyi players
FC Olimpik Donetsk players
FC Dinamo Minsk players
IFK Mariehamn players
FC Yenisey Krasnoyarsk players
FC Metalist Kharkiv players
FC Mynai players
FK Riteriai players
Chrobry Głogów players
Ukrainian expatriate sportspeople in Russia
Ukrainian expatriate sportspeople in Belarus
Ukrainian expatriate sportspeople in Finland
Ukrainian expatriate sportspeople in Lithuania
Ukrainian expatriate sportspeople in Poland